Regan Mathews, better known by his stage name Ta-ku, is an Australian musician, producer and photographer.

Life and career 
Mathews was born and raised in the Australian city of Perth. He is half-Filipino, half-Māori. Mathews attended high school at John Curtin High School. Before he decided to focus on music, Mathews held a sales job at Medibank for five years.  Mathews' stage name "Ta-ku" is a nod to his Māori heritage.

In 2008, an invite to the prestigious Red Bull Music Academy in Barcelona, taking counsel from the likes of DJ Toomp, Chuck D, Bun B, Omas Keith and Dennis Coffey. The trip was a breakthrough moment for Ta-ku as he channeled his experience and new found motivation to liberate a slew of free beat tapes within months of his return. Shortly after flooding the internet with a diverse array of releases, his output was rewarded with subsequent collaborations involving CyHi Da Prynce (G.O.O.D music), John Robinson, Raashan Ahmad (Paper Chain labelmate), Joe Scudda, Outasight, Kid Daytona, Phil Ade, Raaka (Dilated Peoples) amongst many others.

Ta-ku's album Songs to Break Up To was released 8 October 2013. It peaked at No. 18 of the ARIA Album Chart.

Ta-ku has featured on Boiler Room and toured around Australia as part of Listen Out festival in 2014. In May 2015, Ta-ku was a Youth Speaker at TEDxSydney.

Ta-ku made his U.S. live debut at New York's MoMA PS1 in October 2015.

In 2016, Ta-ku collaborated with singer songwriter Wafia to create the album .

Mathews was previously a co-owner of Weston's Barbershop in Northbridge and the fashion brand Team Cozy.

In 2018, Mathews started a creative agency called Pretty Soon with friend Ben Wright. Pretty Soon has done work for Red Bull, Puma, Nike, G-Star and Apple.

From 11 February–6 March 2022, Ta-ku's Songs to Experience ran as part of the Perth Festival. The immersive music installation was a reflection of his forthcoming album of the same name.

Discography

Studio albums

EPs

Singles

As lead artist

As featured artist

Awards

AIR Awards
The Australian Independent Record Awards (commonly known informally as AIR Awards) is an annual awards night to recognise, promote and celebrate the success of Australia's Independent Music sector.

|-
| AIR Awards of 2014
|Songs to Break Up To 
| Best Independent Dance/Electronic Album
| 
|-
| AIR Awards of 2015
|Songs to Break Up to 
| Best Independent Dance/Electronic Album
| 
|-

West Australian Music Industry Awards
The West Australian Music Industry Awards (WAMIs) are annual awards presented to the local contemporary music industry, put on annually by the Western Australian Music Industry Association Inc (WAM).
 
 (wins only)
|-
| 2013
| Ta-ku (Regan Mathews)
| Electronic Producer of the Year
| 
|-
| 2014
| Ta-ku (Regan Mathews)
| Electronic Producer of the Year
| 
|-
| 2015
| Ta-ku (Regan Mathews)
| Electronic Producer of the Year
| 
|-

References

External links
 

Year of birth missing (living people)
Living people
21st-century Australian musicians
Musicians from Perth, Western Australia
Australian hip hop musicians
Australian electronic musicians
21st-century Australian male musicians